The Embassy of the Republic of Angola in Canada was the embassy of Angola in Canada. It was located in Panet House at the corner of Laurier Avenue and King Edward Avenue, next to the University of Ottawa. The embassy was closed in November 2018.

History 

Panet House was built in 1876 by Colonel Charles-Eugène Panet the Deputy Minister of Militia and Defence. In 1915, another owner added on a third storey, converted the house to apartments and replaced the roof with bedroom suites.

It was purchased by the city of Ottawa in 1965 when there was talk of destroying it to make way for the proposed King Edward Expressway, these plans were abandoned however.  In 1975 the city proposed replacing it with a fire station, heritage groups objected to this and eventually the new station was built across the street.  On September 21, 1983 the city council finally declared it to be a heritage structure. In 1986 it was sold to developers who restored it. In 1986, the house became part of the King Edward Avenue Heritage Conservation District. 

For a time it was the Canadian Conference of the Arts before being purchased by the Angolans in the late 1990s. Previously the Angolan embassy had been located in a suite at 75 Albert. 

The building was included amongst other architecturally interesting and historically significant buildings in Doors Open Ottawa, held June 2 and 3, 2012.

See also
 List of designated heritage properties in Ottawa

References

External links
Official site

Angola
Ottawa
Diplomatic residences in Ottawa
Angola–Canada relations